The 2013 FIBA Under-19 World Championship for Women (Lithuanian:2013 m. FIBA iki 19 metų pasaulio moterų čempionatas)was hosted by Lithuania from July 18 until July 28, 2013.

The United States won their fifth straight and sixth overall title by defeating France 69–63 in the final.

Format
Teams played a round robin in the preliminary round, with the top three teams advancing to the main round. The teams played against the teams from the other groups. The top four teams advanced to the knockout stage.

Qualified teams

Group stage
The draw for the tournament was held on 17 January 2013 in Vilnius, Lithuania.

Group A

|}

Group B

|}

Group C

|}

Group D

|}

Classification round

13th–16th place

|}

Eighth-final round

Group E

|}

Group F

|}

Knockout stage

Bracket

5th place bracket

9th place bracket

Quarterfinals

Classification 9–12

Classification 5–8

Semifinals

Eleventh-place game

Ninth-place game

Seventh-place game

Fifth-place game

Bronze-medal game

Final

Statistical leaders
 ''Tournament is still yet to be completed, so statistics are not final

Points

Rebounds

Assists

Blocks

Steals

Final standings

Awards

All-Tournament Team
  Breanna Stewart
  Olivia Epoupa
  Jamie Weisner
  Stephanie Talbot
  Astou Ndour

Referees
FIBA named 25 referees that officiated at the tournament.

  Fabricio Leonardo Vito
  Alexander Eger
  Renaud Geller
  Vander Lobosco Nunes
  Maripier Malo
  Wen Keming
  Aledy Blanco Jiménez
  Kouakou Toussaint Niamien
  Jelena Tomić
  Yudith Hodelin Mendoza
  Anne Panther
  Cheung Kwok Shun Andy
  Zoltán Palla
  Ceciline Victor
  Seffi Shemmesh
  Saverio Lanzarini
  Kim Bo-Hui
  Tomas Jasevičius
  Krishna Viveros
  Milos Koljensic
  Timothy Brown
  Ilya Putenko
  Pualani Thelma Spurlock
  Abdelaziz Abassi
  Özlem Yalman

References

External links
 Official website

2013
Under-19 World Championship 2013 for Women
2013–14 in Lithuanian basketball
International basketball competitions hosted by Lithuania
2013 in youth sport